Ivan Vyacheslavovich Khleborodov (born 13 October 1995) is a Russian football forward. He plays for FC Kaluga.

Club career
He made his debut in the Russian Second Division for FC Baikal Irkutsk on 3 August 2013 in a game against FC Sibir-2 Novosibirsk.

He made his Russian Football National League debut for FC Luch-Energiya Vladivostok on 8 July 2017 in a game against PFC Krylia Sovetov Samara.

References

External links
 

1995 births
Sportspeople from Irkutsk
Living people
Russian footballers
Association football forwards
FC Baikal Irkutsk players
FC Luch Vladivostok players
FC Fakel Voronezh players
FC Volgar Astrakhan players